Mount Axtell  is a low but distinctive rock peak  southeast of Mount Tidd in the Pirrit Hills, Ellsworth Land, Antarctica. It was positioned by the U.S. Ellsworth–Byrd Traverse Party, December 7, 1958, and named for William R. Axtell, Jr., U.S. Navy, cook at Ellsworth Station in 1958 who volunteered to accompany the traverse party.

See also
 Mountains in Antarctica

References

Mountains of Ellsworth Land
One-thousanders of Antarctica